= Deraea =

Deraea or Deraia (Ancient Greek: Δέραια) was a town of ancient Arcadia mentioned by Stephanus of Byzantium.

Its site is unlocated.
